Mitchelstown is a town in County Cork, Ireland with a population of approximately 3,740. Mitchelstown is situated in the valley to the south of the Galtee Mountains, 12 km south-west of the Mitchelstown Caves, 28 km from Cahir, 50 km from Cork, 59 km from Limerick and 10 km from Fermoy. The River Gradoge runs by the town into the River Funshion, which in turn is a tributary of the River Blackwater.
The town is best known as a centre for cheese production. Mitchelstown is within the Cork East Dáil constituency.

Name
The name of Mitchelstown originates from the Anglo-Norman family called 'St Michel' who founded a settlement close to the site of the present town in the 13th century. The parish was originally known as 'Villa Michel'. The modern name comes from the Anglicized version of the later Irish derived Ballyvisteala or Ballymistealy. A nearby earlier settlement was established in the townland of Brigown, it was known by this name and had monastic origins being founded in the 7th century by Saint Fanahan (Fionnchú "White Hound"), a warrior monk famed in medieval times for his fiery temper.

History
The town evolved from a huddle of cabins and lane-ways beside Mitchelstown Castle. Evidence would suggest that the castle was built first and that the village and town came later, probably in the late 13th or early 14th centuries. In the 1770s, the medieval town was replaced by the present town which is situated east and south of King Square. It was laid out in a grid pattern of two main streets intersected by a number of smaller streets. The medieval town was demolished, and the then owners of Mitchelstown — Robert, Viscount Kingsborough (later 2nd Earl of Kingston) and his wife Caroline — built a new palladian styled mansion to replace the earlier castle which had stood on the site. Mitchelstown is today regarded as one of the best planned Georgian towns in Ireland. Some of its streets are named after members of the King family, namely Robert, George, Edward, James, Thomas and King (the family name). The other streets of the Georgian town are Church Street, Baldwin Street, Alley Lane, Chapel Hill, Convent Hill, King Square, New Square and Mulberry Lane.

The layout established by the second and third Earls of Kingston between 1776 and 1830 utilised the natural features of the site to give panoramic views of the Galtee Mountains. This is best illustrated by how George Street was designed with Saint George's Arts and Heritage Centre (formerly Saint George's Church) closing the view on the southern end, and the northern view being terminated by Kingston College and Temple Hill on the Galtee Mountains. Mitchelstown Castle was rebuilt between 1823 and 1825 by the third Earl of Kingston. His new house was the biggest in Ireland. During the Irish Civil War in 1922 the castle was occupied by the Republican Army. During six weeks of occupation, its contents were looted and the building was burnt on 13 August 1922 — ostensibly to prevent it from being used by the Irish Free State Army. However, there is no evidence to support that claim. The real motive for the fire seems to have been an attempt to cover up the looting as well as an wanton destruction. The ashlar limestone of the house stood as a ruin until about 1930 when it was bought by the monks of Mount Melleray Abbey who used it to build their new monastery in County Waterford.

Mitchelstown massacre

Between 1879 and 1881, and again between 1886 and 1888, local tenantry, led by John Mandeville and William O'Brien, MP, organised a rent strike on the Mitchelstown Estate, then owned by Anna, Dowager Countess of Kingston and her second husband, William Downes Webber. On 9 September 1887, a protest was held later in the day in New Market Square outside the Market House where Mandeville and O'Brien were being tried. Neither man appeared in court. After the court ended, approximately 8,000 demonstrators paraded into New Square. As the speeches began from a wagon in the square, the police attempted to get an official police notetaker closer to the platform so that he could hear and record what was being said. Their motives were misunderstood, and they were held back by the crowd. They retreated, returning moments later with fifty reinforcements. This time, they fixed bayonets and used the butts of their rifles to hit horses that had been placed around the edge of the crowd to prevent their access to the wagon. In the melee that followed, hand-to-hand combat involving police being beaten with sticks and stones being thrown at them. The police retreated to their barracks, which was on a house that overlooked part of the square. As the last constable arrived at the barracks, he drew his revolver and fired a single shot into the air. This created confusion amongst the police inside the barracks, who by that time had been placed at the upstairs windows with carbine rifles. Several shots were fired into the crowd. Three men were killed and several more injured. The dead men were John Shinnick of Fermoy, John Casey of Kilbehenny and Michael Lonergan of Galbally, County Limerick. The incident generated considerable international attention and became known as the "Mitchelstown Massacre". The phrase "Remember Mitchelstown" (first coined by William Gladstone ) became a rallying cry for Irishmen at home and abroad. The memorial to Mandeville that stands in Market Square was unveiled in 1906 by William O'Brien MP. It also commemorates the names of the three men killed in 1887.

Economy

Co-operative
Up to 1989, Mitchelstown was the headquarters for Mitchelstown Co-operative Agricultural Society Ltd, which for over fifty years had been Ireland's largest co-operative. This farmers co-op was founded in 1919. Between 1919 and 1989, Mitchelstown Co-op Creameries became the largest and most important dairy processing business in the island of Ireland. It became highly respected for its processed cheese brands but was better known in overseas dairy industry circles for the high quality and large variety of its natural cheeses which were extensively exported around Europe and for which it earned many international prizes.

In the 1930s the co-op promoted the introduction of intensive pig production in the Mitchelstown area as another source of farm income. A noted agriculturalist, Alexander Aloysius ("Sandy") McGuckian from Cloughmills, near Ballymena, County Antrim was engaged by the co-op to help train local people in modern intensive animal production methods. As a result, several of Ireland's largest industrial pig farms were based in the Mitchelstown area. McGuckians' sons (Alastair and Paddy) subsequently established Masstock International. Masstock became one of the pioneers of the establishment of a modern dairy industry in Saudi Arabia as a result of its minority shareholding (largely disposed of in 1991) in the Almarai Group, a joint venture with majority shareholder HH Prince Sultan Bin Mohamed Bin Saud Al Kabeer.

In 1989 Mitchelstown Co-operative merged with Ballyclough Co-operative (based in Mallow, County Cork) to create an enlarged Dairygold Co-Operative. The co-op is now the largest farmer owned co-operative in Ireland with its headquarters in Mitchelstown.

The first manager of Mitchelstown Creameries, was Eamon Roche, a Dairy Science Diploma graduate of the Albert College in Dublin (now called Dublin City University – DCU) who had been active in the Irish War of Independence between 1916 and 1921. Roche was also a close personal friend of Éamon de Valera who subsequently became leader of Fianna Fáil, Irish Taoiseach and later President of Ireland. Roche was succeeded (following his sudden death) in 1952 by J.J. Lynch who, following his sudden death in 1964, was succeeded by John McCarthy.

Retail
Mitchelstown has a wide variety of retail outlets such as Tesco, Lidl, Aldi+ Aldi Distribution Centre , Super Valu, Centra, Dealz. Mitchelstown also has a number of smaller shops, butchers, cafes and restaurants.

Transport

Road
Road transport dominates in Mitchelstown. The town is situated close to the M8 Dublin to Cork motorway, which runs to the east and can be accessed from Junctions 12 and 13.

A relief road located to the west of the town serves to filter N73 traffic towards Mallow and R513 traffic towards Limerick. The construction of the relief road to the west and north, and its connection in 2009 to the M8 to the east of Mitchelstown means that the town has become the smallest in Ireland to have a full 360-degree ring road. Prior to the opening of the relief road in 2006, the N8 ran through Mitchelstown itself, seriously congesting the main street. The R665 road connects Mitchelstown to Clonmel, while the former N8 now redesignated as the R639 provides an alternative route from Mitchelstown to Cork, Fermoy and Cahir.

Bus
Bus Éireann runs frequent intercity services through the town providing a service to both Dublin and Cork.

Rail
Mitchelstown railway station opened on 23 March 1891, closed to passenger and goods traffic on 27 January 1947 and closed on 1 December 1953.

Air
The nearest airport is Cork Airport, which is 57 km away.

Mitchelstown caves

The Mitchelstown Caves are limestone caves located near the R639, between Mitchelstown and Cahir. One cave, Mitchelstown Cave itself, is privately owned and has been developed as a show cave, with a number of caverns open to the public through a guided tour. Some of the speleothems are noteworthy including the Tower of Babel formation. Various other stalactites, stalagmites and rock formations are also named and famous for their unique and impressive structures.

Notable people
Seán Clancy, Air Corps general, current Chief of Staff of the Irish Defence Forces
Michael Francis Crotty (born 1970), Roman Catholic prelate and diplomat, current Apostolic Nuncio to Burkina Faso and Niger and titular archbishop of Lindisfarne, grew up in Skeheen
John Dunne (18451919), Roman Catholic prelate, Bishop of Bathurst
Liam Hamilton (19282000), judge and barrister, former Chief Justice of Ireland
Margaret King (17731835), hostess, writer, traveller and medical adviser
John Roach (18151887), proprietor of America's largest post-Civil War shipbuilding empire, John Roach & Sons
Kevin Roche (19222019), American architect and son of Eamon Roche, Mitchelstown Co-operative Creameries' first general manager, raised in the town
William Trevor (19282016), author, five-time Booker Prize nominee, born and spent his early childhood in the town

Events

Indiependence is an annual three-day festival weekender which typically takes place on the August Bank Holiday. The event has hosted acts like Editors, Bastille, Hozier, Public Enemy, The Coronas, Tom Odell, Ash, Feeder, 2manydjs and White Lies. It has been shortlisted as one of the best small festivals in Europe on a number of occasions.

See also
Market Houses in Ireland

References

Sources
Bill Power, Another Side of Mitchelstown, Psyops Books, 2008.
Bill Power, White Knights, Dark Earls, the rise and fall of an Anglo-Irish Dynasty,' The Collins Press, 2000.
Bill Power, Mitchelstown Through Seven Centuries, Eigse Books, 1987.
Bill Power, The Mitchelstown Saints, Mitchelstown, 1980.
Bill Power, Evensong, the story of a Church of Ireland country parish, Mount Cashell Books, 1994.
Tom O'Donnell, The Turbulent life of Dean Morgan O'Brien, Mitchelstown 2009.
Elizabeth Bowen, Bowen's Court, London, 1940.

External links

 
 Mitchelstown Poor Law Union and Workhouse
 Mitchelstown Brass Band Homepage

 
Towns and villages in County Cork